Ken Norton (1943–2013) was an American professional boxer.

Ken Norton may also refer to:
Ken Norton Jr. (born 1966), American football coach and former linebacker
Kendrick Norton (born 1997), American football defensive tackle
Ken Norton (basketball) (c. 1914–1996), American basketball coach
Ken Norton (cricketer) (1932–2018), English cricketer

See also
Ken Morton (born 1947), English footballer